Lieutenant General Sir Herbert Eversley Belfield,  (25 September 1857 – 19 April 1934) was a British Army officer who commanded the 4th Division from 1907 to 1911.

Military career
Belfield was born in Dover, the son of Capt. William Belfield. Educated at Wellington College, Belfield was commissioned into the Royal Munster Fusiliers in 1876. He was promoted to captain on 20 May 1885, and to major on 1 February 1893. He took part in the Fourth Anglo-Ashanti War in 1895, and was promoted to lieutenant colonel on 25 March 1896 and to colonel on 18 December 1899.

With the outbreak of the Second Boer War (1899–1902), he was appointed Inspector General of the Imperial Yeomanry and Assistant Adjutant General to Lieutenant General Lord Methuen. From January 1902 he held the local rank of brigadier general on the Staff in South Africa. He was mentioned in despatches on 23 June 1902 by Lord Kitchener, Commander-in-Chief in South Africa during the latter part of the war, and returned home in the SS Kinfauns Castle leaving Cape Town in early August 1902, after the war had ended. For his service in the early part of the war he was appointed a Companion of the Order of the Bath (CB) in the April 1901 South Africa Honours list (the award was dated to 29 November 1900; he only received the actual decoration from King Edward VII at Buckingham Palace on 24 October 1902). He was further awarded the Distinguished Service Order (DSO) in the October 1902 South Africa Honours list.

Belfield was appointed Assistant Adjutant-General for 1st Army Corps on 11 December 1902, Commander of 4th Infantry Brigade in 1903 and General Officer Commanding 4th Division in 1907 before retiring in 1914. He was also Colonel of the Duke of Wellington's Regiment from 1909 to 1914.

In retirement Belfield became Director of Prisoner of war work, negotiating prisoner exchanges and improvements in the treatment of prisoners throughout the First World War. There is a chair dedicated to his memory at York Minster Stoneyard.

Family
In 1882, he married Emily Mary Binney, eldest daughter of Rev. Hibbert Binney, the Bishop of Nova Scotia; she died a year later. In 1888, he married Evelyn Mary Taylor; they had two daughters.

References

1857 births
1934 deaths
British Army lieutenant generals
Knights Commander of the Order of the Bath
Knights Commander of the Order of St Michael and St George
Knights Commander of the Order of the British Empire
Companions of the Distinguished Service Order
People educated at Wellington College, Berkshire
Royal Munster Fusiliers officers
British military personnel of the Fourth Anglo-Ashanti War
British Army personnel of the Second Boer War
Military personnel from Kent